Syncirsodes is a genus of moths in the family Geometridae erected by Arthur Gardiner Butler in 1882. Both species are found in Chile.

Species
Syncirsodes deustata (Felder & Rogenhofer, 1875)
Syncirsodes straminea Butler, 1882

References

Geometridae
Endemic fauna of Chile